Sowmya Raoh is an Indian playback singer who has performed in Kannada, Tamil, Hindi and Telugu languages.

Early life and career

Sowmya was born in a Kannada speaking family to veteran singer B. K. Sumitra and Sudhakar in Bangalore, Karnataka, India. Sowmya has a brother named Sunil Raoh, who is an actor in the Kannada film industry. Her mother is popular playback and devotional singer in Kannada. As a child, Sowmya would accompany her mother to the studios for recording. She then slowly graduated to become a child singer. Sowmya's father worked in Reserve Bank of India.

Sowmya started singing at the age of seven. She took a break from singing while she was in school as she thought that would affect her studies. After a period of five to six years, she gradually turned her attention towards singing by learning Carnatic music. However, she ended up becoming a voice actor before venturing into films. She claims that, "I wanted to train for singing for heroines, not children".

Musical career

Sowmya started her career as a singer in south Indian films in 1993, and got a break in Bollywood nine years later. Her major break happened when composer Sandeep Chowta was looking for a singer who could sing well in Hindi. He chose Sowmya for a song ("Greekuveerudu") in the Telugu film Ninne Pelladata. The song gave her a much needed break. She went on to record the song in the Tamil and Hindi versions too.

Sowmya started her career in Bollywood in 2000. Her first assignment was for the song "Soul of Jungle", followed by a background track for the film Pyaar Tune Kya Kiya. Company was her first as a singer in Hindi. By this time she also sang for other Hindi films such as Dum and Bunty Aur Babli. In 2012, her item number 'Dreamum Wakeupum' for Sachin Kundalkar's Aiyyaa emerged a chartbuster and the song was also appreciated for its dance performance by Rani Mukerji and Prithviraj Sukumaran.

Having worked with composers such as Ilaiyaraaja and A. R. Rahman, she recorded over 200 songs in Tamil, Telugu and Kannada, as of 2006.

Selected discography

Accolades

Filmfare Awards
 2013 – Filmfare Award for Best Female Playback Singer – Kannada for "Karagida Baaninalli" from Simple Agi Ondh Love Story

Stardust Awards
 Stardust Award for Best New Singer for " Laila Laila" from Samay: When Time Strikes (2003).

References

External links

Living people
Indian women playback singers
Kannada playback singers
Tamil playback singers
Telugu playback singers
Filmfare Awards South winners
Singers from Bangalore
Film musicians from Karnataka
21st-century Indian women singers
21st-century Indian singers
1973 births